How Robinson Was Created (translit. ) is a 1961 short Soviet film directed by Eldar Ryazanov. The film is part of the comedy anthology film series Absolutely Seriously.

Plot
Chief editor of the "Adventure Business" magazine decides to commission a novel from the famous writer Moldavantsev which is to be a continuation of the famous literary creation of Daniel Defoe, Robinson Crusoe. The writer initially takes on his task with great enthusiasm and soon the editor gets to read Moldavantsev's manuscript. Despite the fact that the writer tried to create a "soviet" Robinson, the editor remains deeply unsatisfied. He pressures Moldavantsev to make major adjustments to his work. Union members, a contribution collecting secretary of the local committee, and even a safe - all this, according to the editor must show up, along with Robinson at the supposedly deserted island! The apotheosis of editorial changes becomes the proposal to exclude the character of Robinson from the novel.

Cast
 Anatoli Papanov - Editor of magazine "Adventure business" 
 Sergey Filippov - Moldavantsev, writer / presenter of film almanac Pavel Tarasov - film critic in the Prologue (uncredited) George Kulikov - screenwriter in the Prologue (uncredited) Petr Repnin - film critic in the Prologue (uncredited)''

References

External links

1961 films
1960s Russian-language films
Films directed by Eldar Ryazanov
Soviet comedy films
Russian comedy short films
1961 comedy films
1961 short films
Soviet short films